The Museum of Life is located at the Oswaldo Cruz Foundation, in Rio de Janeiro, Brazil.

Location
The museum is located on the campus of Oswaldo Cruz Foundation at Manguinhos, Rio de Janeiro.

References

External links
Museum of Life website
Museum of Life website 
Science Communication Website Invivo
Brazilian Association of Science Centres and Museums

Science museums in Brazil
Museums in Rio de Janeiro (city)
Medical museums in Brazil